Açorda is a typical Portuguese dish composed of thinly sliced bread with garlic, finely chopped coriander, olive oil, vinegar, water, white pepper, salt and poached eggs. Throughout Portugal, Açordas have significant variations, most notably in the Alentejo, where an Açorda, also called Açorda Alentejana, can be considered a soup, whereas in other regions of Portugal it has a consistency similar to a bread paste. Other variations can have shrimps or codfish.

The eggs are poached in salted water. Garlic, coriander and salt  are "mashed" into a coarse paste, olive oil and vinegar are added in, and then the mixture is poured over the bread. The eggs are then placed over the bread and the water used to poach them, with chicken stock, is poured over. The açorda is then left to steam for a few minutes. The final dish usually has a bright green flare.

Etymology

The etymology of the term “açorda” goes back to the Arabic language. The etymological root, tharada, means "to break bread". The classic form found in Arabic literature is tharîd or tharîda, with the plurals tharâ’id or thurûd, meaning “crumbed and soaked bread”.

The Portuguese term “açorda” comes, however, from the dialectal form of Andalusi Arabic, spoken in the Iberian Peninsula, thurda / çurda or thorda / çorda, the latter the etymological link closest to the current Portuguese term, and to which the article “al” was associated, which, in certain cases it loses its normal consonant sound, and starts to be pronounced like the first letter of the next word, such as açúcar, as-sukkar, or azeite, from az-zayt.

History
The primitive Arab Açorda, tharîd, can be traced as far as the 5th century in the Pre-Islamic Arabia. It is one of the most characteristic dishes of the Arab cuisine and its creation is attributed to Hāshim ibn ‘Abd Manāf. This açorda would most resemble a meat and pumpkin stew, to which breadcrumbs were added.

With the arrival of Muslims in the Iberian Peninsula at the beginning of the 8th century, the açorda, now known as thurûd, also arrived. There are two known books in which thurûd is referenced: FuDâlat al-Khiwân fi Tayyibât al-Ta'am wa-l-Alwân (The Highlight of the Tables, in the Delights of Food and Different Dishes), written by Ibn Razîn al-Tujibî; and the anonymous Hispanic-Maghreb Cuisine Treaty.

One of the first designations of the term açorda is found in Gil Vicente's Farsa dos Almocreves: “Tendes uma voz tão gorda/ que parece alifante/ depois de farto de açorda”.

References

External links
  A Guide on How to Make Açorda à Alentejana

Portuguese cuisine